Cambalopsidae, is a family of Round-backed millipedes of the order Spirostreptida. The family includes species belongs to 16 genera.

Genera
 
Agastrophus
Cambalopsis
Chonecambala
Dolichoglyphius
Glyphiulus
Hypocambala
Ilyspasticus
Javichus
Nesocambala
Paratrachiulus
Phanolene
Plusioglyphiulus
Podoglyphiulus
Trachyjulus
Trichocambala
Trichonannolene

References

Spirostreptida
Millipede families